Zengir (also Romanized as Zengīr) is a village in Ojarud-e Markazi Rural District of the Central District of Germi County, Ardabil province, Iran. At the 2006 census, its population was 494 in 110 households. The following census in 2011 counted 398 people in 110 households. The latest census in 2016 showed a population of 296 people in 94 households; it was the largest village in its rural district.

References 

Germi County

Towns and villages in Germi County

Populated places in Ardabil Province

Populated places in Germi County